The Houston Street Viaduct (formerly the Dallas-Oak Cliff Viaduct) is a viaduct in Dallas, Texas, that carries Houston Street across the Trinity River, connecting Downtown Dallas and Oak Cliff. Designed by Ira G. Hedrick, it was built in 1911, and is listed on the National Register of Historic Places.

History
The viaduct project was conceived after the Great Trinity River Flood of 1908, which destroyed existing bridges connecting Oak Cliff with downtown Dallas. In 1909, Dallas County voters approved a $600,000 bond issue for the new bridge.

See also
List of bridges documented by the Historic American Engineering Record in Texas
List of bridges on the National Register of Historic Places in Texas
National Register of Historic Places listings in Dallas County, Texas

References

External links

Bridges in Dallas
Historic American Engineering Record in Texas
National Register of Historic Places in Dallas
Viaducts in the United States
Road bridges on the National Register of Historic Places in Texas